Ispat Stadium is a cricket stadium located in Rourkela, Odisha. The ground is mainly used for organizing matches of football, cricket and other sports. The stadium has hosted three Ranji Trophy matches in 1972 when Odisha cricket team played against Bihar cricket team. The stadium also hosted three List A matches from 1990 to 1993  as well as a Youth One Day International in 1990 when India Under-19 cricket team played Pakistan Under-19 cricket team. Up to January 2016 it was again ready to host national and list A matches and it is well maintained stadium.

History 
Ispat Stadium was built by SAIL in the year of 1969, which has lush green grass field and played all major sports activities. Stadium is well maintained by SAIL-RSP, different national and district level sports are conducting here like cricket, football, basketball court and athletic workout.

References

External links 

 cricketarchive
 cricinfo
 Wikimapia

Rourkela
Sports venues in Odisha
Cricket grounds in Odisha
Defunct cricket grounds in India
Sports venues completed in 1969
1969 establishments in Orissa
Monuments and memorials to Jawaharlal Nehru
20th-century architecture in India